is former temple in Hiraizumi in what is now southern Iwate Prefecture in the Tōhoku region of Japan. The site is designated as both a Special Place of Scenic Beauty and a Special National Historic Site.

Overview
Muryōkō-in was built by Fujiwara no Hidehira, the third of the Northern Fujiwara rulers of Hiraizumi. It was designed to imitate the Phoenix Hall of Byōdō-in in Uji, south of Kyoto, but on a larger scale. The temple was described in the Kamakura period chronicle, Azuma Kagami.

Twice a year, the centerline of the hall was aligned with the sun setting behind Mount Kinkeisan to the west, creating an image of the Pure Land . Nothing remains of the temple today except for some foundation stones and the remnants of earthen walls. The twelfth-century garden with pond, island and ornamental stones has been reconstructed and was designated a Special Historic Site

The temple area is about 240 meters east-west by 270 meters north-south. Although part of the site was destroyed by railway construction, the foundation stones and garden remained. As a result of a survey in 1952, it was determined that the main hall was a five by four bay hall, and that there were at least three more buildings. There are few temple ruins from the latter half of the Heian period, and the Muryōkō-in ruins are considered to have high academic value. In 2011, the site was designed part of  the UNESCO World Heritage Site Historic Monuments and Sites of Hiraizumi.

The ruins are approximately minutes on foot from Hiraizumi Station on the JR East Tohoku Main Line.

See also 
 World Heritage Sites in Japan
List of Historic Sites of Japan (Iwate)

References

 For an explanation of terms concerning Japanese Buddhism, Japanese Buddhist art, and Japanese Buddhist temple architecture, see the Glossary of Japanese Buddhism.

External links 

Hiraizumi's Cultural Heritage 
Japan National Tourism Organization
Hiraizumi Touism Association

Buddhist temples in Iwate Prefecture
Buddhist archaeological sites in Japan
World Heritage Sites in Japan
Special Historic Sites
Parks and gardens in Iwate Prefecture
Hiraizumi, Iwate
Buddhism in the Heian period
9th-century establishments in Japan